Sumeet Saigal (born 18 February 1966) is a former Indian Bollywood actor and producer who was active in the Bollywood film industry from 1987 to 1995, appearing in over 30 films.

Career
Saigal made his debut in the 1987 film Insaniyat Ke Dushman and played leading or supporting roles in films opposite actors like Sanjay Dutt, Govinda and Mithun Chakraborty amongst others. Some of his well-known films are Imaandaar (1987), Param Dharam (1987), Lashkar (1989), Bahaar Aane Tak (1990), Pati Patni Aur Tawaif (1990) and Gunaah (1993). In 1995, he acted in his last films Saajan Ki Baahon Mein and Sauda and left the film industry. After 12 years out of the limelight, he directed the music video for a song featured in the film Red: The Dark Side in 2007. In 2010, he produced the horror film Rokkk, starring Udita Goswami and Tanushree Dutta. Currently, he has a production company named "Sumeet Arts", which dubs South Indian films into Hindi.

Personal life
Sumeet was married to Shaheen, the niece of actress Saira Banu in 1990 and they have one daughter named Sayyeshaa, born in 1997, who is a film actress and made her debut in 2015. The couple got divorced in 2003.

Sumeet Saigal later married actress Farah Naaz in 2003.

Filmography

1987 - Imaandaar
1987 - Insaniyat Ke Dushman
1987 - Param Dharam
1988 - Tamacha
1988 - Zulm Ko Jala Doonga
1988 - Aag Ke Sholay
1988 - Souten Ki Beti
1989 -  Apna Desh Paraye Log
1989 - Billoo Badshah
1989 - Dost Garibon Ka
1989 - Garibon Ka Daata
1989 - Lashkar
1989 - Sikka
1989 - Sindoor Aur Bandook
1989 - Souten Ki Beti
1989 - Ab Meri Baari
1989 - Apne Begaane
1989 - Nishane Baazi
1989 - Tu Nagin Main Sapera
1990 - Bahaar Aane Tak
1990 - Maha-Sangram
1990 - Meri Lalkaar
1990 - Nyay Anyay
1990 - Pati Patni Aur Tawaif
1990 - Shandaar
1990 - Choron Ki Rani Hasino Ka Raja
1990 - Kasam Dhande Ki
1991 - Khatra
1991 - Swarg Jaisaa Ghar
1991 - Mehandi Ban Gai Khoon
1991 - Naag Mani
1992 - Sarphira
1992 - Jethaa
1993 - Gunaah
1993 - Dharam Ka Insaaf
1994 - Janam Se Pehle
1995 - Saajan Ki Baahon Mein
1995 - Sauda
1996 - Sikander (video)
2002 - Samay Kheluchhi Chaka Bhaunri

 Zee Horror Show   Mr Rajesh Sinha  Tara (TV series)   Mini aka miki Arzu Wife Episode 84 94

References

External links

Indian male film actors
Male actors in Hindi cinema
Film producers from Mumbai
Living people
Male actors from Mumbai
Indian Hindus
20th-century Indian male actors
21st-century Indian male actors
1966 births